Yellow Quill 90 is an Indian reserve of the Yellow Quill First Nation in Saskatchewan. It is 19 kilometers northwest of Kelvington. In the 2016 Canadian Census, it recorded a population of 436 living in 110 of its 121 total private dwellings. In the same year, its Community Well-Being index was calculated at 45 of 100, compared to 58.4 for the average First Nations community and 77.5 for the average non-Indigenous community.

References

Indian reserves in Saskatchewan
Division No. 14, Saskatchewan